WCHA is an oldies formatted broadcast radio station licensed to Chambersburg, Pennsylvania, serving Chambersburg in Pennsylvania and Hagerstown in Maryland.  WCHA is owned and operated by Alpha Media.

Translator

References

External links
Oldies 96.3 Online

CHA
Radio stations established in 1946
1946 establishments in Pennsylvania
Alpha Media radio stations